Glenea wegneri is a species of beetle in the family Cerambycidae. It was described by Gilmour and Stephan von Breuning in 1963. It is known from Borneo.

References

wegneri
Beetles described in 1963